This is a list of notable footballers who have played for Middlesbrough. Generally, this means players that have played 100 or more first-class matches for the club, or been an officially designated captain.

Players are listed according to the date of their first-team debut for the club. Appearances are for first-team competitive matches only; wartime matches are excluded. Substitute appearances included. Statistics correct as of 5 May 2008.

Notable players

(n/a) = Information not available

Key to positions
 GK — Goalkeeper
 RB — Right back
 LB — Left back
 CB — Centre back
 MF — Midfielder
 RW — Right Winger
 LW — Left Winger
 FW  — Forward

See also
Middlesbrough F.C.
Middlesbrough F.C. Player of the Year
List of Middlesbrough F.C. records and statistics

Notes and references

 End of contract
 Initial fee £2.5 million, rising to just over £5 million based on appearances.

Players
 
Middlesbrough F.C. players
Association football player non-biographical articles